The first season of the science fiction television series The X-Files commenced airing on the Fox network in the United States on September 10, 1993, and concluded on the same channel on May 13, 1994, after airing all 24 episodes.

The first season introduced main characters of the series, including Fox Mulder and Dana Scully who were portrayed by David Duchovny and Gillian Anderson, respectively, and recurring characters Deep Throat, Walter Skinner, and Cigarette Smoking Man. The season introduced the series' main concept, revolving around the investigation of paranormal or supernatural cases, known as X-Files, by the Federal Bureau of Investigation; it also began to lay the groundwork for the series' overarching mythology.

Initially influenced by Kolchak: The Night Stalker and The Twilight Zone, series creator Chris Carter pitched the idea for the series to Fox twice before it was accepted for production. The season saw the series quickly gaining popularity, with ratings rising steadily throughout its run; and garnered generally positive reviews from critics and the media. It helped to make stars of its two lead roles, and several of its taglines and catchphrases have since become cultural staples.

Concept and themes 

Although Carter initially conceived of the series based on the influence of Kolchak and The Twilight Zone, he has stated that the "leaping-off point" for the series' overall concept came from UFO lore. After being introduced to the works of John E. Mack—especially a study by Mack which had reported that three percent of Americans claimed to have been abducted by aliens—Carter believed he had found his central theme. It was decided that the series would focus on the FBI in order to avoid something Carter had seen as a failing in Kolchak, whereby mysterious events would continually occur in one locale and be accidentally uncovered by the same character—by creating a fictional FBI unit which actively uncovered these paranormal cases, it was felt that the series would be "sustainable week after week without stretching the parameters of credibility". Early in the planning stages, Carter had envisioned that a significant proportion of the episodes would deal with investigations which uncovered hoaxes or cases which had been mistakenly viewed as paranormal. Although this decision never came to pass, the third-season episode "Jose Chung's From Outer Space" can be seen as a holdover from the idea.

The series revolves around its two main characters, which had been defined early in conception as the "believer" and the "skeptic". Of these, the "believer", Fox Mulder, was created with a character-defining personal motivation, involving the disappearance of his younger sister during his childhood, which he would believe to be a result of alien abduction. The creation of the "skeptic", Dana Scully, was influenced by Jodie Foster's portrayal of Clarice Starling in The Silence of the Lambs, leading the crew to decide that the character needed to seem "real", as opposed to the "bombshell" type of character the studio was pressing for.

Thematically, although the series focused heavily on alien abduction lore, the decision was made early on to allow the plots of individual episodes to branch out into different territories in order to prevent the overarching plot from running out of momentum, which led to standalone episodes such as "Squeeze" being developed. The variety of storylines which the series has shown has led director Daniel Sackheim to note that "The X-Files has sort of found its own style in that it doesn't have a confined style to it", adding that the series' "fluid" approach has meant that "everybody who comes on the show attempt to make a little scary movie". To this end, several episodes feature varying plots, with alien-influenced storylines varying between "Ice", a "briskly-paced" episode set in a single location, and the character-driven "Conduit", which served to fill in background on the characters. Elsewhere, plots focused on soul transference or reincarnation, with the episodes "Shadows", "Born Again" and "Lazarus" sharing similar storylines. The plot of "Ghost in the Machine" featured a malevolent artificial intelligence; while "Shapes" introduced the first of what would become several Native American-themed episodes.

The first season also introduced a number of minor characters who would go on to become central figures to the series—The Lone Gunmen, first seen in "E.B.E.", would become regular characters beginning the second season, eventually starring in the spin-off series The Lone Gunmen; whilst the episode "Tooms" introduced Walter Skinner, portrayed by Mitch Pileggi, who would go on to be billed as a series star by the ninth season. The abduction of Mulder's sister Samantha was explored in the episodes "Pilot", "Conduit", and "Miracle Man", and would go on to become one of the central themes of the series as a whole.

Production

Development 
California native Chris Carter was given the opportunity to produce new shows for the Fox network in the early 1990s. Tired of the comedies he had been working on for Walt Disney Pictures, inspired by a report that 3.7 million Americans may have been abducted by aliens, and recalling memories of Watergate and the 1970s horror series Kolchak: The Night Stalker, Carter came up with the idea for The X-Files and wrote the pilot episode in 1992. He initially struggled over the untested concept—executives wanted a love interest for Scully—and casting. The network wanted either a more established or a "taller, leggier, blonder and breastier" actress for Scully than the 24-year-old Gillian Anderson, a theater veteran with minor film experience, who Carter felt was the only choice after auditions.

Carter's initial pitch for The X-Files was rejected by Fox executives. He fleshed out the concept and returned a few weeks later, leading to the commission of the pilot. Carter worked with NYPD Blue producer Daniel Sackheim in further developing the pilot, drawing stylistic inspiration from the 1988 documentary The Thin Blue Line, and the English television series Prime Suspect. Inspiration was also taken from Carter's memories of watching Kolchak: The Night Stalker and The Twilight Zone in his youth; as well as from the then-recently released film The Silence of the Lambs, which was the impetus for framing the series around agents from the FBI, in order to provide the characters with a more plausible reason for being involved in each case than Carter believed was present in Kolchak. Carter was also keen on keeping the relationship between the two lead roles strictly platonic, basing their interactions on the characters of Emma Peel (Diana Rigg) and John Steed (Patrick Macnee) in the series The Avengers.

During the early stages of production for the series, Carter founded Ten Thirteen Productions, and began to plan for filming the pilot in Los Angeles. However, unable to find suitable locations for many of the scenes, Ten Thirteen Productions made the decision to "go where the good forests are", and moved production to Vancouver, where the series would remain for the next five seasons; production would eventually shift to Los Angeles beginning with the sixth season. It was soon realized by the production crew that since so much of the first season would require filming on location, rather than on sound stages, two location managers would be needed, rather than the usual one.

Casting 

David Duchovny had worked in Los Angeles three years prior to The X-Files, and at first had wanted to base his acting career around films. But in 1993 his manager, Melanie Green, gave him a script for the pilot episode of series. Green and Duchovny were both convinced it was a good script, so Duchovny auditioned for the lead. When Duchovny was auditioning for the part of Fox Mulder, he made a "terrific" audition, but spoke rather slowly. Chris Carter thought at the beginning of the auditioning for the character, he was a "good judge of character", and thought that Duchovny wasn't rather "bright". So he went and talked to Duchovny and asked him if he could "please" imagine himself as an FBI agent for the "future" week. The casting director of the show was very positive towards him. According to Carter, Duchovny turned out to be one of the best-read people he knew. Carter recalls being contractually obliged to provide Fox with a choice of two actors for the role; however, he was confident Duchovny was the right choice from the outset. After getting the role, Duchovny thought the show wouldn't last for long or that it wouldn't make much impact.

Gillian Anderson was cast due to insistence from Carter that she would fit the role perfectly; however, Fox executives had wanted a more glamorous "bombshell" for the part, hoping that this would lead to the series involving a romantic element. This led Carter to insist that he did not want the roles of Mulder and Scully to become romantically involved, citing the relationship between the lead roles in Moonlighting as an example to avoid. Anderson called her early work on the show "a complete learning experience for me – the pilot was only the second time I'd been in front of a camera".

The series also introduced the character of Walter Skinner, played by Mitch Pileggi, who would go on to become a recurring, and later, main character in the show. The character had been conceived as playing against the stereotypical bureaucratic "paper-pusher", being instead someone more "quietly dynamic". Pileggi had auditioned unsuccessfully for several other parts on the series before being cast as Skinner. At first, the fact that he was asked back to audition for the role had puzzled him, until he discovered the reason he had not cast for the previous parts—Chris Carter had been unable to imagine Pileggi as any of those characters, due to the fact that the actor had been shaving his head. When Pileggi attended the audition for Walter Skinner, he had been in a grumpy mood and had allowed his small amount of hair to grow back. Pileggi's attitude fit well with the character of Skinner, causing Carter to assume that the actor was only pretending to be grumpy. After successfully auditioning for the role, Pileggi thought he had been lucky that he had not been cast in one of the earlier roles, as he believed he would have appeared in only a single episode and would have missed the opportunity to play the recurring role of Walter Skinner.

Glen Morgan and James Wong's early influence on The X-Files mythology led to their introduction of popular secondary characters who would continue for years in episodes written by others, such as the Scully family—Dana's father William (Don S. Davis), mother Margaret (Sheila Larken) and sister Melissa (Melinda McGraw)—as well as conspiracy-buff trio The Lone Gunmen.

Writing 
Initially, there was no certainty as to how long the series would go on, and as a result there was no long-term plan in the beginning to guide its writers. Although the initial impetus for the show was based on alien abduction lore, the crew believed that the series would not be able to maintain its momentum for long if it did not branch out into different plot ideas. The show's first season thus featured numerous standalone stories involving monsters, and also diverse alien or governmental cover-ups, often with no apparent connection to each other—such as the Arctic space worms in "Ice", and the conspiracy of genetically engineered twins in "Eve". Carter himself wrote "Space", an intended bottle episode about the manifestation of an alien "ghost" in the NASA space shuttle program, which was subject to cost overruns and became the most expensive of the first season.

By the end of the first season, Carter and his staff had come up with many of the general concepts of the mythology that would last throughout all nine seasons. The first season introduced the series' primary antagonist, Cigarette Smoking Man, and gave early insight into the disappearance of Mulder's sister Samantha, whose abduction provided one of the main plot threads of the series as a whole. The emergent mythology was further solidified in the Carter-penned, Edgar Award-nominated season finale "The Erlenmeyer Flask". The episode was written in early 1994 before it was known whether or not the series would be renewed for a second season, and featured the closure of the X-Files unit and the reassignment of Fox Mulder and Dana Scully to new jobs within the FBI. The finale was the first episode directed by R. W. Goodwin, who had served as producer for the series.

Cast and crew

Main cast 
 David Duchovny as Special Agent Fox Mulder
 Gillian Anderson as Special Agent Dana Scully

Recurring cast 
 Jerry Hardin as Deep Throat
 William B. Davis as Cigarette Smoking Man

Guest cast

Writers and producers 
Series creator Chris Carter also served as executive producer and showrunner and wrote nine episodes. Co-executive producers and writing team Glen Morgan and James Wong wrote six episodes. Supervising producers and writing team Alex Gansa and Howard Gordon wrote five episodes together, with Gordon co-writing an additional script with Carter. Co-producers and writing team Larry and Paul Barber wrote one episode. Executive script consultant Chris Ruppenthal wrote one episode. Kenneth Biller and Chris Brancato co-wrote a freelance script. Other freelance writers included Scott Kaufer and Marilyn Osborn, who each wrote one episode. Other producers included line producer Joseph Patrick Finn and co-producer Paul Rabwin.

Directors 
David Nutter directed the most episodes of the first season, directing six. "Pilot" supervising producer Daniel Sackheim directed two episodes. Other directors that directed two episodes included Jerrold Freedman, William Graham, Michael Lange, Joe Napolitano and Larry Shaw. One-episode directors included Rob Bowman, Fred Gerber, co-executive producer R. W. Goodwin, Michael Katleman, Harry Longstreet and Robert Mandel who directed the pilot episode.

Episodes 
Episodes marked with a double dagger (‡) are episodes in the series' alien mythology arc.

Reception

Ratings 
From the outset, viewing figures for the series were good, with the initial broadcast of "Pilot" being watched by 7.4 million households, which constituted 15 percent of the viewing audience at the time. The series was broadcast directly after episodes of The Adventures of Brisco County, Jr., and saw a decline in viewing figures when that series began to falter. The season—and series as a whole—reached a low with "Fallen Angel", which was viewed by only 5.1 million households. However, after the episode aired, the numbers began to rise steadily once again, reaching a peak for the season with "The Erlenmeyer Flask", which was viewed by 8.3 million households, 16 percent of the available audience. At the conclusion of the 1993–94 television season, The X-Files ranked 105th out of 128 shows. The ratings were not spectacular, but the series had attracted enough fans to be classified as a "cult hit", particularly by Fox standards, and was subsequently renewed for a second season.

Reviews 
Reviews for the first season were mostly positive, with the series being described as "the most paranoid, subversive show on TV", and the writing being called "fresh without being self-conscious, and the characters are involving. Series kicks off with drive and imagination, both innovative in recent TV". The season as a whole currently holds an 83% rating on review aggregator website Rotten Tomatoes, based on 35 reviews, with a critical consensus stating, "A serious approach to its premise helps establish The X-Files as a sci-fi procedural with a genuinely creepy twist – and a thrilling drama that avoids devolving into pure camp." On Metacritic, the season scored 70 out of 100, based on 14 reviews, indicating "Generally favorable reviews". Writing for IGN, Mike Miksch noted that "some of the episodes were at a level of excellence that still hasn't been matched since"; adding that the series has "become nearly as integral to pop culture today as any show in history". Bill Hunt of The Digital Bits gave the season an "A", stating "The X-Files is a show that dared to be different, and different it was". Hunt described the show's cinematography as "striking and noir-ish". Anna Johns, writing for TV Squad, called the season "phenomenal" and added that it contains "many terrific episodes".

Several episodes were widely praised, including "Squeeze", which has been called "profoundly creepy"; the "taut and briskly paced" Arctic-set "Ice"; and the "remarkably chilling" Scully-centered episode "Beyond the Sea". However, not all episodes of the season were as well received. Despite the costly production of "Space", the episode was derided as "decidedly unscary" and "a little tasteless" in its treatment of the Challenger disaster. "The Jersey Devil" was described as "pretty silly", whilst the plots for "Shadows", "Born Again", and "Roland" were panned for being much too similar to each other.

Accolades 
The first season received two Primetime Emmy Award nominations, with one win. Composer Mark Snow was nominated for Outstanding Individual Achievement in Main Title Theme Music, while title designers Bruce Bryant, James Castle and Carol Johnsen won for Outstanding Individual Achievement in Graphic Design and Title Sequences.

DVD release

References

Bibliography

External links 

 

 
1993 American television seasons
1994 American television seasons